Elections to Trafford Council were held on 8 May 1986.  One third of the council was up for election, with each successful candidate to serve a four-year term of office, expiring in 1990. The Conservative Party lost overall control of the council, to no overall control.

Because the Conservative Candidate for Priory ward, G. V. Burrows, (presumably inadvertently) wrote his occupation in the description box of his nomination paper, his party allegiance is listed on all official records and press coverage of this election as "Taxi Driver". However, as he was, in fact, the official Conservative Candidate, and therefore would doubtless have taken the Conservative whip had he been elected, he is listed on this page as a Conservative, rather than an Independent.

After the election, the composition of the council was as follows:

Ward results

References

1986 English local elections
1986
1980s in Greater Manchester